The 2019 Taça de Macau was the 2019 iteration of the Taça de Macau, the top football knockout competition in Macau. It is organized by the Macau Football Association.

Participating clubs
 Benfica de Macau
 Cheng Fung
 Chao Pak Kei
 Development
 Hang Sai
 Ka I
 Monte Carlo
 Polícia
 Sporting de Macau
 Tim Iec

First round

Quarter-finals

Semi-finals

Third place match

Final

See also
2019 Liga de Elite

References

External links
Macau Football Association 

2
Macau